Killian Donnelly (born 25 June 1984) is an Irish tenor. He has appeared in musicals and plays, such as Les Misérables,  The Phantom of the Opera, The Commitments, Memphis and Kinky Boots.

Background
Donnelly is from Kilmessan, in County Meath, Ireland, where he was a member of the St Mary's Musical Society. He has one sister, Eimear, and one brother, Ciaran, who still live in Ireland. Donnelly is a tenor and plays piano and guitar.

Donnelly was scouted by a theatre agency while performing in a production in Ireland. He then made the move to London to pursue a career in musical theatre, securing a role in the West End production of Les Misérables.

Career
Donnelly has appeared in many different roles around Ireland and has also directed and written shows. His first theatre role was in 2005 where he featured in the chorus of The Wireman at the Gaiety Theatre, Dublin. He then continued to play Rod in Singin' in the Rain and Ethan in The Full Monty, both at the Olympia Theatre, Tony in West Side Story at the Solstice Theatre, Aladdin in Aladdin and Collins in Michael Collins: A Musical Drama, both at the Cork Opera House, Prince Charming in Cinderella at the Gaiety Theatre, Dublin and Chorus in Sweeney Todd: The Demon Barber of Fleet Street at the Gate Theatre.

In 2008, he joined the West End production of Les Misérables as a swing and, as a member of the cast, was part of the Les Misérables concert with the Bournemouth Symphony Orchestra on the Isle of Wight. He became second cover Javert and Enjolras in the following season of 2009/10, during which time he also performed the lead role of Jean Valjean as an emergency cover multiple times. With the following cast change he was promoted to principal Enjolras and was officially listed (and performed) as third cover Valjean. He eventually finished in Les Misérables on 18 June 2011.

Donnelly's next role was Raoul in Andrew Lloyd Webber's The Phantom of the Opera at Her Majesty's Theatre.Gareth Gates Joins West End's LES MIZ 10/18 During this time, he also featured in commercials for McDonald's and Jameson Whiskey, and appeared on such television shows as The Tudors, The Open House, The Late Late Show and Showbands. He later performed in You Should Be Dancing at the National Concert Hall.

On 3 October 2010, Donnelly played the role of Courfeyrac in the 25th Anniversary Concert of Les Misérables at The O2 Arena in London. He also played the role of Combeferre in the film of the show, released in 2012.

On 12 November 2012, Donnelly took over the role of Tony in Billy Elliot The Musical at the Victoria Palace Theatre.

On 20 August 2013, it was confirmed that Donnelly would originate the role of Deco in the West End Musical The Commitments from 21 September. The following year Donnelly began playing the role of Huey in Memphis from 9 October 2014 for which he was nominated as Best Actor in a Musical in the 2015 Olivier Awards

On 23 April 2015, it was announced that Donnelly would play Charlie in the West End production of the musical Kinky Boots, at the Adelphi Theatre. The first preview was on 21 August 2015. On 29 February 2016 Donnelly was nominated as Best Actor in a Musical at the 2016 Olivier Awards. He left the show on 13 August 2016 and moved back to Ireland to play Jackie Day in Donegal, a new play by Frank McGuinness.

On 6 December 2016, he made his Broadway debut, reprising the role of Charlie Price in Kinky Boots.

On 12 June 2017, Donnelly returned to the West End production of Les Misérables to play the lead role, Jean Valjean, subsequently reprising the role in the 2018 tour in the United Kingdom and Ireland.

On 29 February 2020, he returned to The Phantom of the Opera, this time playing The Phantom on the 2020 UK Tour. Due to the 2020 COVID-19 pandemic, the tour was closed just a few weeks into its run at Curve, Leicester, ending Donnelly's run as the Phantom on tour.

On 4 December 2020, it was announced that Donnelly would reprise the role of The Phantom in the West End production of The Phantom of the Opera'' when it was scheduled to reopen in June 2021. After two and a half years in the role, Donnelly performed his last show as The Phantom on 3rd February 2023.

Filmography & Television

Theatre Credits

References

External links
 

1984 births
Living people
People from County Meath
Irish male musical theatre actors